Sarajuy-ye Sharqi Rural District is in Saraju District of Maragheh County, East Azerbaijan province, Iran. At the National Census of 2006, its population was 13,697 in 2,679 households. There were 12,540 inhabitants in 3,271 households at the following census of 2011. At the most recent census of 2016, the population of the rural district was 13,209 in 3,899 households. The largest of its 30 villages was Karamjavan, with 2,584 people.

References 

Maragheh County

Rural Districts of East Azerbaijan Province

Populated places in East Azerbaijan Province

Populated places in Maragheh County